The Old Navarino castle is a 13th-century Frankish fortress near Pylos, Greece. It is one of two castles guarding the bay on which it sits; the other is the Ottoman-built New Navarino. It is frequently known simply as Palaiokastro or Paliokastro ("old castle"). It occupies the site of the Athenian fort at the 425 BC Battle of Pylos.

Name

History
The castle sits atop an imposing  rock formation on the northern edge of the bay, flanked by sheer cliffs; the naturally defensible site has probably been occupied since classical times. Although there are no physical barriers to access, the castle ruins have been declared "closed" because the structure is considered dangerous.

In 1204, following the Fourth Crusade, the Peloponnese or Morea came under the rule of the Principality of Achaea, a Frankish Crusader state. According to the French and Greek versions of the Chronicle of the Morea, the castle was built by Nicholas II of Saint-Omer, the lord of Thebes, who in  received extensive lands in Messenia in exchange for ceding his wife's possessions of Kalamata and Chlemoutsi to the princely domain. According to the Greek version, he intended this as a future fief for his nephew, Nicholas III, although the Aragonese version attributes the construction to Nicholas III himself, a few years later. According to the medievalist Antoine Bon, a construction under Nicholas II in the 1280s is more likely, possibly in the period 1287–89 when he served as the viceroy of Achaea. Despite Nicholas II's intentions, however, it is unclear whether his nephew did indeed inherit Navarino. If he did, it remained his until his death in 1317, when it and all the Messenian lands of the family reverted to the princely domain, as Nicholas III had no children.

The fortress remained relatively unimportant thereafter, except for the naval battle in 1354 between Venice and Genoa, and an episode in 1364, during the conflict between Mary of Bourbon and the Prince Philip of Taranto, due to Mary's attempt to claim the Principality following the death of her husband, Robert of Taranto. Mary had been given possession of Navarino (along with Kalamata and Mani) by Robert in 1358, and the local castellan, loyal to Mary, briefly imprisoned the new Prince's , Simon del Poggio. Mary retained control of Navarino until her death in 1377. At about this time, Albanians settled in the area, while in 1381/2, Navarrese, Gascon and Italian mercenaries were active there. From the early years of the 15th century, Venice set its eyes on the fortress of Navarino, fearing lest its rivals the Genoese seize it and use it as a base for attacks against the Venetian outposts of Modon and Coron. In the event, the Venetians seized the fortress themselves in 1417 and, after prolonged diplomatic manoeuvring, succeeded in legitimizing their new possession from the Prince of Achaea, Centurione II Zaccaria, in 1423.

In 1423, Navarino, like the rest of the Peloponnese, suffered its first Ottoman raid, led by Turakhan Bey, which was repeated in 1452. It was also at Navarino that Emperor John VIII Palaiologos embarked in 1437, heading for the Council of Ferrara, and where the last Despot of the Morea, Thomas Palaiologos, embarked with his family in 1460, following the Ottoman conquest of the Despotate of the Morea. After 1460, the fortress, along with the other Venetian outposts and Monemvasia and the Mani Peninsula, were the only Christian-held areas in the peninsula. Venetian control over Navarino survived the First Ottoman–Venetian War (1463–79), but not the Second (1499–1503): following the Venetian defeat in the Battle of Modon in August 1500, the 3,000-strong garrison surrendered, although it was well provisioned for a siege. The Venetians nevertheless recaptured it shortly after, on 3/4 December, but on 20 May 1501, a joint Ottoman land and sea attack under Kemal Reis and Hadım Ali Pasha retook it.

In 1572/3, the Ottoman chief admiral (Kapudan Pasha) Uluç Ali Reis built the New Navarino fortress, to replace the outdated Frankish castle, and the latter declined rapidly in importance: the new fortification covered better the main practical entrance to the bay towards the south, especially as the narrower northern entrance was blocked in 1571 by ships scuttled in the aftermath of the Battle of Lepanto; the new site also had a more secure water supply. By the late 16th century, the old castle had only a token garrison, and it became increasingly dilapidated and partly ruined through the 17th century. During the Morean War, the Ottomans concentrated their defenses at the new castle, and the old castle's 100-man garrison surrendered to the Venetians under Francesco Morosini without a battle on 2 June 1686. Along with the rest of the Peloponnese, the fortresses remained in Venetian hands until 1715, when the Ottomans recaptured them. The Venetians considered either improving or demolishing the fortress, but ended up making few modifications before it was retaken by the Ottomans. Neither were any major repairs or improvements made by the Ottomans, though it was garrisoned with a token force. In April–June 1770, the area was temporarily held by the Russians, during the Russo-Turkish War of 1768–74 and the Russian-inspired Orlov Revolt in Greece.

After the outbreak of the Greek War of Independence in March 1821, the Greeks captured the New Navarino fortress and slaughtered its garrison on the first week of August 1821. The area remained in Greek hands until 1825, when Ibrahim Pasha of Egypt captured the old castle on 29 April, followed by New Navarino on 11 May. The Ottoman-Egyptian garrison remained there until it was handed over to the French troops under General Nicolas Joseph Maison in spring 1828. The French found the old castle essentially a ruin.

References

Sources
 
 
 
 
 

Buildings and structures completed in the 13th century
Castles and fortifications of the Principality of Achaea
Medieval Messenia
Buildings and structures in Messenia
Pylos
13th-century fortifications in Greece